Rangeview Intermediate School is a school  in Te Atatū South, West Auckland, New Zealand.

References

Intermediate schools in Auckland
Schools in West Auckland, New Zealand